Glyphipterix erastis is a species of sedge moth in the genus Glyphipterix. It was described by Edward Meyrick in 1911. It is found in New Zealand.

References

Moths described in 1911
Glyphipterigidae
Moths of New Zealand